Cottontail rabbits are the leporid species in the genus Sylvilagus, found in the Americas. Most Sylvilagus species have stub tails with white undersides that show when they retreat, giving them their characteristic name. However, this feature is not present in all cottontails nor is it unique to the genus. 

The genus is widely distributed across North America, Central America and northern and central South America, though most species are confined to some particular regions. Most species live in nests called forms, and all have altricial young. An adult female averages three litters per year, which can occur in any season; occurrence, and litter size depend on several factors including time of the year, weather, and location. The average litter size is four but can range from as few as two to as many as eight, most of whom do not go on to survive to adulthood.

Cottontail rabbits show a greater resistance to myxomatosis than European rabbits.

Evolution 
Cottontails are one of several species of Sylvilagus; their closest relative is Brachylagus, the pygmy rabbit. They are more distantly related to the European and other rabbits, and more distantly still to the hares. The cladogram is based on mitochondrial gene analysis.

Lifespan 

The lifespan of a cottontail averages about two years, depending on the location. Almost every living carnivorous creature comparable to or larger in size than these lagomorphs is a potential predator, including such diverse creatures as domestic dogs, cats, humans, snakes, coyotes, mountain lions, foxes, and if the cottontail is showing signs of illness, even squirrels. The cottontail's most frequent predators are various birds of prey. Cottontails can also be parasitized by botfly species including Cuterebra fontinella. Newborn cottontails are particularly vulnerable to these attacks. Cottontails use burrows vacated by other animals, and the burrows are used for long enough periods that predators can learn where the cottontails reside and repeatedly return to prey on the lagomorphs. Though cottontails are prolific animals that can have multiple litters in a year, few of the resulting offspring survive to adulthood. Those that do grow very quickly and are full grown adults at three months.

Eating mechanics 
In contrast to rodents, (squirrels, etc.) which generally sit on their hind legs and hold food with their front paws while feeding, cottontail rabbits eat while on all fours. Cottontail rabbits typically only use their nose to move and adjust the position of the food that it places directly in front of its front paws on the ground. The cottontail will turn the food with its nose to find the cleanest part of the vegetation (free of sand and inedible parts) to begin its meal. The only time a cottontail uses its front paws while feeding is when vegetation is above its head on a living plant, at which point the cottontail will lift its paw to bend the branch to bring the food within reach.

Cottontails are rarely found out of their burrows looking for food on windy days, because the wind interferes with their hearing capabilities. Hearing an incoming predator before they get close enough to attack is their primary defense mechanism.

Species 

The subgenera were described in the 19th century based on limited morphological data that have been shown to not be of great use, nor to depict phylogenetic relationships.  Molecular studies (limited in scope to the mitochondrial 12S gene) have shown that the currently accepted subgeneric structure, while of some heuristic value, is unlikely to withstand additional scrutiny.

Prehistoric species 
Sylvilagus hibbardi (Early-Mid Pleistocene) 
Sylvilagus leonensis - Dwarf cottontail (Late Pleistocene)
Sylvilagus webbi (Pleistocene)

References 

 
Taxa named by John Edward Gray